DLR Group is an employee-owned integrated design firm providing architecture, engineering, planning, and interior design. Their brand promise is to elevate the human experience through design. A self-described advocate for sustainable design, the firm was an early adopter of the Architecture 2030 Challenge, and an initial signatory to the AIA 2030 Commitment and the China Accord.

History
DLR Group, named for architects Irving Dana, Bill Larson, and engineer Jim Roubal, was founded on April 1, 1966 in Omaha, Nebraska, as Dana Larson Roubal and Associates, after leaving Leo A Daly to start their own firm. The name was changed to DLR Group in 1996.

The company has carried out a series of acquisitions, including purchases of Lescher & Mahoney of Phoenix in 1974; John Graham and Co. of Seattle, architects behind the Space Needle, in 1986; Newman, Cavendar & Doane of Denver in 2007; KKE Architects of Minneapolis, who were involved in the construction of Mall of America, WWCOT of Los Angeles in 2010; and Sorg Architects of Washington, D.C., in 2015.  In the summer of 2021, the company added healthcare focused firms Salus Architecture in Seattle, and Wright McGraw Beyers Architects in Charlotte, North Carolina, as well as K12 focused firms BakerNowicki Design Studio in San Diego, California, and Bowie Gridley Architects in Washington, D.C. Currently, the firm has 30 locations across the globe.

In 1978, DLR Group implemented an employee stock ownership program, which resulted in the firm becoming 100% employee owned in 2005.

The firm is currently led by CEO Steven McKay, RIBA.

Services 
DLR Group follows an integrated design model of design and building delivery. The firm has experience in the development of Civic, Justice, Federal, Healthcare, Higher Education, Hospitality, K-12 Education, Retail, Sports, and Workplace projects. Their services offered include architecture, engineering, interiors, planning, acoustical design, experiential graphic design, high performance design, landscape architecture, lighting design, preservation, reality capture, lab design, sustainability, and theater design. 

DLR Group is an organization that focuses on sustainable construction, and adheres to the United States' LEED building design program and was an early adopter of solar hot water, renewable energy creation, and geothermal systems.

Recognitions 
DLR Group was ranked #1 in ARCHITECT's Top 50 ranking of U.S. design firms in 2012, and has appeared on the list each year since 2010.

2014 AIA COTE Top Ten and LEED Platinum Certification for the Wayne N. Aspinall Federal Building. 

2015 AIA Healthcare Design Award for the Cleveland Clinic Brunswick Emergency Department.

2017 American Architecture Award for Missouri Innovation Campus in Lee's Summit, Missouri.

2018 AIA COTE Top Ten for The Smithsonian American Art Museum’s Renwick Gallery restoration.

2020 American Architecture Award for the Triumph multifamily housing facility.

2021 American Architecture Award for the Portland Building.

2021 American Architecture Award for the Shenzhen Opera House.

Notable Projects 

 Museum of Science and History (MOSH)
 Cleveland Museum of Natural History
 The Rock & Roll Hall of Fame
 Museum at Bethel Wood (Woodstock)
 The Smithsonian American Art Museum’s Renwick Gallery
 The Pennsylvania Academy of the Fine Arts in Philadelphia.
 Maltz Performing Arts Center renovation
 The Portland Building renovation
 Pittsburgh Playhouse renovation
 St. Joseph's Health Amphitheater
 Murphy Arts District
 Playhouse Square
 Balboa Theater
 Tennessee Theater
 Oberlin College and Conservatory of Music
 SAFE Credit Union Performing Arts Center
 Straz Center for the Performing Arts
 Multiple facilities for the Cleveland Clinic
 University of Florida Institute of Black Culture and Institute of Hispanic-Latino Cultures
 Cascade Hotel in Kansas City, Missouri
 Mall of America expansions, and a planned waterpark addition
 Canyon View High School
 Compton High School
 Los Angeles Memorial Coliseum renovation
 Riverfront Stadium in Wichita, Kansas
 CHI Health Center Omaha
 LAX People Mover
 Chinatown SFMTA Station
 Canopy by Hilton Minneapolis Mills
 Kimpton Cottonwood Hotel
 St. Nicholas Greek Orthodox Church lighting design

Locations 
DLR Group currently has 30 locations across the globe. 

Twenty-eight offices are within the United States of America:

 Austin, Texas
 Charlotte, North Carolina
 Chicago, Illinois
 Cleveland, Ohio
 Colorado Springs, Colorado
 Columbus, Ohio
 Dallas, Texas
 Denver, Colorado
 Des Moines, Iowa
 Honolulu, Hawaii
 Houston, Texas
 Kansas City, Kansas
 Lincoln, Nebraska
 Los Angeles, California
 Minneapolis, Minnesota
 New York, New York
 Omaha, Nebraska
 Orlando, Florida
 Phoenix, Arizona
 Portland, Oregon
 Riverside, California
 Sacramento, California
 San Diego, California
 San Francisco, California
 Seattle, Washington
 Tucson, Arizona
 Washington, D.C.

There are two office outside the United States, located in the United Arab Emirates and China:

 Dubai
 Shanghai

References

External links 

 

Architecture firms based in Nebraska
Engineering consulting firms of the United States
International engineering consulting firms
American companies established in 1966
Design companies established in 1966
1966 establishments in Nebraska